Milo Milton Quaife (1880–1959) was a historian of Michigan and the Great Lakes region. 

Quaife was born in Nashua, Iowa. He received his education at Grinnell College, the University of Missouri and the University of Chicago. He was head of the Wisconsin Historical Society and later secretary-editor at the Detroit Public Library's Burton Collection. He was also a lecturer at Wayne State University and the University of Detroit.  He served as editor of the Lakeside Classics historical series from 1916 to 1957.

References

Transcription of article on Quaife's death
Library Thing entry for Quaife

External links
 
Works by Milo Quaife at Project Gutenberg

20th-century American historians
20th-century American male writers
Grinnell College alumni
University of Missouri alumni
University of Chicago alumni
1880 births
1959 deaths
American male non-fiction writers
Wayne State University faculty